Richmond Precision Engineering Ltd v Pearce [1985] IRLR 179 is a UK labour law case, concerning redundancy.

Facts
Mr Pearce was offered a new contract with the company that had bought his employer's business. Pay was lower, hours were more, holidays were reduced and the occupational pension and fringe benefits were gone. He rejected the offer and claimed unfair dismissal.

The Tribunal upheld Mr Pearce's unfair dismissal claim, and Richmond Precision Engineering appealed.

Judgment
Beldam J in the EAT overturned the Tribunal. The test was whether a reasonable employer could have offered the same terms in the circumstances, including ones disadvantageous or advantageous to both parties. The employee being worse off was not a sufficient reason.

See also

UK labour law

Notes

References

United Kingdom labour case law
Employment Appeal Tribunal cases
1985 in British law
1985 in case law